Puncheon rum (or puncheon) is a high proof heavy-type rum produced in Trinidad and Tobago. Three local brands, Forres Park, Caroni and Stallion produce bottles that are 75% alcohol by volume. The first puncheon rum is said to have been manufactured in 1627 by the makers of Caroni Puncheon Rum. It is sometimes referred to in Trinidad and Tobago as "firewater".

The name 'Puncheon' is derived from the giant wooden casks, known as 'puncheons' in which the rum was stored. The first distillation of rum took place on the sugarcane plantations of the Caribbean in the 17th century. Plantation slaves first discovered that molasses, a by-product of the sugar refining process, can be fermented into alcohol.

References

Trinidad and Tobago cuisine
Rums